is a city located in Akita Prefecture, Japan. , the city had an estimated population of 49,150 in 24,079 households.and a population density of 120 persons per km2.

Geography 
Noshiro is located in the flat coastal plains northwestern Akita Prefecture, bordered by the Sea of Japan to the west, but there are hills near the border with Mitane and along the coast. Much of the eastern part of the city is mountainous. The Yoneshiro River flows through the city and empties into the Sea of Japan near Noshiro Port.

Neighboring municipalities
Akita Prefecture
Kitaakita
Fujisato
Mitane
Happō
Kamikoani

Climate
Noshiro has a Humid subtropical climate (Köppen climate classification Cfa) with large seasonal temperature differences, with warm to hot (and often humid) summers and cold (sometimes severely cold) winters. Precipitation significant throughout the year, but is heaviest from August to October.

Demographics
Per Japanese census data, the population of Noshiro has been declining over the past 60 years.

History
Per the Nihon Shoki and other ancient chronicles, Noshiro is the location where an expedition sent by the Yamato Court led by Abe no Hirafu landed in 658 AD with orders to force the local Emishi tribes into submission. Trade vessels from Balhae were calling at Noshiro Port as late as 771 AD. The area of present-day Noshiro was part of ancient Dewa Province, dominated by the Satake clan during the Edo period, who ruled Kubota Domain under the Tokugawa shogunate. The town of Nishirominato was established on April 1, 1889 with the establishment of the modern municipalities system.

The city of Noshiro was created by the merger of the town of Noshirominato and the villages of Shinonome and Sakaki (all formerly from Yamamoto District)  on October 1, 1940.

On March 21, 2006, the town of Futatsui (from Yamamoto District) was merged into Noshiro.

Government
Noshiro has a mayor-council form of government with a directly elected mayor and a unicameral city legislature of 20 members. The city (together with the towns of Yamamoto District)  contributes four members to the Akita Prefectural Assembly.  In terms of national politics, the city is part of  Akita 2nd district of the lower house of the Diet of Japan.

Economy
The economy of Noshiro is based on agriculture and commercial fishing. Tohoku Electric operates the Noshiro Thermal Power Station, a coal / biomass power plant in the city.

Education
Noshiro has seven public elementary schools and six public junior high schools operated by the city government, and four public high schools operated by the Akita Prefectural Board of Education. The prefecture also operates one special education school for the handicapped.

Noshiro Technical High School

Transportation

Airport 
 Odate-Noshiro Airport - opened in 1998

Railway
 East Japan Railway Company - Ōu Main Line
  -   -  - 
 East Japan Railway Company - Gonō Line
 -  -  -  -

Highway

Seaports
Port of Noshiro

Sister city relations
  - Wrangell, Alaska, United States, since December 16, 1960

Local attractions
 Kaze no Matsubara - one of the 100 Soundscapes of Japan by the Japanese Ministry of the Environment
Noshiro Swimming Beach
Noshiro Onsen

Festivals
Noshiro Yakutanabata
Tenku no Fuyajo
Noshiro Port Fireworks Festival in 2008 had 150,000 visitors.
Onagori Festival in Noshiro Kanto matsuri, Aomori Nebuta Matsuri, Samba Carnival and more. In 2008, 250,000 people visited.

Noted people from Noshiro
Ando Chikasue, Daimyo
Masumi Asano, voice actress
Hosei Norota, politician
Shuji Ono, Basketball head coach
Takashi Ono, Olympic gymnast
Sadatoshi Sugawara, Olympic volleyball player
Hisashi Yamada, professional baseball player

References

External links

Official Website 

 
Cities in Akita Prefecture
Populated coastal places in Japan
Port settlements in Japan